The women's combined competition of the 2019 Winter Universiade was held at Bobrovy Log, Krasnoyarsk, Russia on 4 March 2019.

Results
The race was started at 10:00 (super-G race) and 13:30 (slalom race).

References

Women's combined